Independent National Radio (INR) is the official term for the three national commercial radio stations currently or previously broadcasting on analogue radio in the United Kingdom. The two stations currently or previously broadcasting on AM were allocated frequencies previously used by BBC Radio 3 (to be used by INR2) and BBC Radio 1 (to be used by INR3).

Background
The stations came about following the Broadcasting Act 1990 which allowed for the launch of independent national radio (INR) stations in the United Kingdom. The Radio Authority was mandated to award three INR licences. The FM licence (INR1) had to be for a 'non-pop' station and one (INR3) had to be for a predominantly speech-based service. The remaining licence (INR2) was to be open to 'all-comers'. The licences were to be awarded to the highest cash bidder, providing that the applicant met criteria set down in the Broadcasting Act.

Plans for a fourth station, using 225 kHz long wave, were mooted in 1996 but were abandoned by the Radio Authority after consultation with the radio industry which found that there was no interest in launching a station on that frequency due to the costs involved, especially to cover all of the country given that the frequency would only provide partial-UK coverage. The frequency had originally been allocated to the BBC but it had never been used.

INR licences come with certain privileges and responsibilities that are not shared by Independent Local Radio stations:

 Ofcom mandates a list of transmitters across the UK from which the INR stations must be broadcast.
 The INR licensees are automatically allocated a spot on the national Digital One DAB multiplex.
 INR stations are required to carry party political broadcasts during general election periods.
As of 2011, the INR licence holders paid Ofcom a nominal annual fee of £10,000.

INR stations

On air 
Classic FM (INR1) - 99.9 to 101.9 MHz, first air date 7 September 1992, owned by Global Radio.
Talksport (INR3) - 1053 kHz and 1089 kHz in most areas, first air date 14 February 1995 as Talk Radio UK, owned by Wireless Group.

No longer broadcasting on analogue radio 
Absolute Radio (INR2) - 1215 kHz mediumwave in most areas, first air date 30 April 1993 as Virgin 1215, owned by Bauer Radio.  It closed its medium wave transmitters on 20 January 2023.

All three stations are also available nationally on DAB on the Digital One multiplex as well as on digital TV and online.

References

Radio in the United Kingdom
Broadcasting in the United Kingdom